Isabella of Valois (1313 – 26 July 1383) was a Duchess of Bourbon by marriage to Peter I, Duke of Bourbon.  She was the daughter of Charles of Valois by his third wife Mahaut of Châtillon.

Life
On 25 January 1336 Isabella married Peter I, Duke of Bourbon, son of Louis I, Duke of Bourbon and Mary of Avesnes. Peter and Isabella had only one son, Louis and seven daughters. Her husband died at the Battle of Poitiers in 1356, and Isabella never remarried. 

After her husband's death Isabella's son Louis became the Duke of Bourbon. In the same year 1356, Isabella arranged for her daughter Joanna to marry Charles V of France; as he was at the time the Dauphin of France, Joanna duly became Dauphine.

She had as her butler Jean Saulnier, knight, lord of Thoury-on-Abron, councilor and chamberlain of the king, bailli of Saint-Pierre-le-Moûtier.

Upon becoming a widow, Isabella took the veil. She died on 26 July 1383 at the age of seventy. She was buried in Eglise des Frères Mineurs in Paris.

Issue
 Louis II, Duke of Bourbon, 1337-1410, became Duke of Bourbon in 1356 married Anne of Auvergne had issue.
 Joanna of Bourbon, 1338-1378, married King Charles V of France, had issue.
 Blanche of Bourbon, 1339-1361, married King Peter of Castile, she was murdered by him in 1361 and had no issue.
 Bonne of Bourbon, 1341-1402, married Amadeus VI of Savoy, by whom she had issue.
 Catherine of Bourbon, 1342-1427, married John VI of Harcourt
 Margaret of Bourbon, 1344-1416, married Arnaud Amanieu, Lord of Albret, by whom she had issue.
 Isabelle of Bourbon, 1345-1345, died young
 Marie of Bourbon, 1347-1401, prioress of

Ancestors

References

Isabella
1313 births
1383 deaths
Isabella
French princesses
14th-century French people 
14th-century French women